Vithukal is a 1971 Indian Malayalam film, directed and produced by P. Bhaskaran. The film stars Madhu, Sheela, Sukumari and Kaviyoor Ponnamma in the lead roles. The film had musical score by Pukazhenthi.

Cast

Madhu as Unnikrishnan
Sheela as Sarojini
Sukumari as Sarada
Kaviyoor Ponnamma as Ammini
Adoor Bhasi as Eravan Nair
Sankaradi as Achuthan Nair
Kannan
Adoor Bhavani as Amma
Baby Indira
Balakrishna Menon
K. P. Ummer as Chandran
N. Govindankutty as Raghavan
Nambiar
Raghava Menon
Vanchiyoor Radha as Madhavi
Renuka
P. R. Menon

Soundtrack
The music was composed by Pukazhenthi and the lyrics were written by P. Bhaskaran.

References

External links
 

1971 films
1970s Malayalam-language films
Films directed by P. Bhaskaran
Films scored by Pukazhenthi